Pacha González (born in  Buenos Aires in 1975) Argentine Tango singer and songwriter

Biography 
Pablo “Pacha” González was born in Buenos Aires in 1975. As a teenager, he started playing the piano participating in several projects with different music styles. He later developed his skill as a composer, singer and songwriter of Tango. He is currently regarded as one of the leading figures in Neo-Tango or Nuevo Tango. Since 2012, when he recorded his first album, Alma de Rejilla, Pacha González has been part of the porteña (from Buenos Aires City) Tango scene singing his own songs. In 2015, he released his second album El tango interminable, featuring acclaimed guest artists at Orlando Goñi Theatre (currently Galpón B) and in La Usina del Arte, as part of Buenos Aires Tango Festival. Several orchestras and bands playing the new Tango repertoire give renditions of his songs. 
In 2016 and 2017 he toured Europe, with his band already formed: "Los interminables" in which a bandoneon, a bass and drums are added to the piano. With this band he records his third album Interama.

Discography 
 2012: Alma de rejilla
 2015: El tango interminable
 2018: Interama

References

External links 

Tango musicians
Argentine pianists
Male pianists
1975 births
Living people
21st-century pianists